In 2011, Kent County Cricket Club competed in Division Two of the County Championship, Group A of the 40-over Clydesdale Bank 40 and the South Group of the Friends Life t20. Kent also hosted a Twenty20 match at the St Lawrence Ground against the touring Indians, and a three-day first-class MCC Universities match against Loughborough MCCU, also at the St Lawrence Ground. It was the second and final season in charge for Director of Cricket Paul Farbrace. The club captain was former England batsman Rob Key who had been club captain since 2006. Pakistan fast bowler Wahab Riaz joined Kent as their overseas player in June, and another fast bowler, South African Charl Langeveldt, signed as Kent's second overseas player for the Friends Life t20 competition only.

Kent finished a very disappointing eighth of nine in Division Two of the County Championship in their first season since relegation from Division One. They won 6 and lost 6 matches in the Clydesdale Bank 40, leaving them in the middle of the final Group A standings (they did not progress to the knock-out stages). Kent did progress to the quarter-final stage of the Friends Life t20 after finishing in 3rd place in the South Group, with the side winning 9 out of 14 completed matches. They lost their quarter final at Grace Road against Leicestershire, in what was a high scoring game, by 3 wickets.

Squad
Fast bowler Amjad Khan left Kent at the end of the 2010 season to join Sussex, having been at the county since 2001. This, coupled with injuries affecting the remaining bowling unit, lead to Kent making several new signings.

Pakistan fast bowler Wahab Riaz joined Kent as their overseas player in June. Another fast bowler, South African Charl Langeveldt, signed as Kent's second overseas player for the Friends Life t20 competition only (two overseas players were permitted in this tournament). Langeveldt in fact also played a single match in the Clydesdale Bank Pro40 competition against the Netherlands immediately after the conclusion of the Twenty20 group stage. Charlie Shreck signed on loan from Nottinghamshire in early April, but was recalled by his county just a few days later after playing in just one County Championship match. Shreck would later sign for Kent on a permanent contract after being released by Nottinghamshire at the end of the season, and would remain at the club for the next two seasons.

South Africa-born Scotland international bowler Dewald Nel left Kent early in the season due to an ongoing back injury. Nel had signed a two-year contract with Kent in March 2010. Former Surrey bowler Neil Saker was on trial with Kent over the winter and played four first-class matches in May due to injuries to several other bowlers. However, he did not win a long-term contract. Kent signed David Balcombe from Hampshire on loan in early July initially for one month, but the player remained at the county until the end of the season.

The squad for 2011 featured a number of young players, including Adam Ball, Sam Billings, Daniel Bell-Drummond, Adam Riley and Ashley Shaw, who all made their first-class debuts during the season.

Fast bowler Robbie Joseph left the club after the end of the season, having debuted for the county in 2004, and would go on to sign for Leicestershire. Joseph would return to the county for a brief spell in 2014.

Kent suffered a double blow at the end of the 2011 season when high-profile players Joe Denly and Martin van Jaarsveld left the county. Van Jaarsveld had initially agreed to join Leicestershire, but later cancelled the deal and instead announced his retirement from county cricket in November 2011, citing fatigue. Denly signed for Middlesex in order to play Division One cricket and enhance his chances of reviving his international career with England. Denly and van Jaarsveld debuted for Kent in 2004 and 2005, respectively.

Squad list
 Ages given as of the first day of the County Championship season, 8 April 2011.

County Championship

Division Two

Matches

Other first-class match

MCCU match

Clydesdale Bank 40

Group A

Matches

Friends Life t20

South Division

Matches

Quarter-finals

Twenty20 tour match

Statistics

Batting

Bowling

References

External links
Kent home at ESPN cricinfo
Kent County Cricket Club official site

2011
2011 in English cricket